Henry Lippitt (October 9, 1818 – June 5, 1891) was the 33rd Governor of Rhode Island from 1875 to 1877.

Family
Lippitt was the son of Warren Lippitt and Eliza (Seamans) Lippitt, married to Mary Ann Balch. Lippitt was the father of Charles Warren Lippitt, another Rhode Island Governor, and the father of Henry F. Lippitt, a U.S. Senator from Rhode Island; the grandfather of Rhode Island House Minority Leader Frederick Lippitt; the great-grandfather of John Chafee, another Rhode Island Governor, U.S. Senator and Secretary of the Navy); and the great-great-grandfather of Lincoln Chafee, the former U.S. Senator and governor of Rhode Island.

Business
Lippitt was the president of the Lippitt Woolen Company and owned various textile mills, including Lippitt Mill in West Warwick and the Hanora Mills and Social Mill in Woonsocket.  He was also a vice president of the Rhode Island Institution for Savings and the president of the Rhode Island National Bank.

Governorship
Lippitt was a Republican and succeeded fellow Republican Henry Howard as governor of Rhode Island on May 25, 1875. He was governor for two years and was then succeeded by another Republican, Charles C. Van Zandt, on May 29, 1877.

Home

The Governor Henry Lippitt House is located on the East Side of Providence. Completed in 1865, it was designated a National Historic Landmark in 1976, and in 1981 was donated by the Lippitt family to Preserve Rhode Island.

References

External links

Rhode Island Historical Society: Lippitt Family Papers
National Park Service: Henry Lippitt House
Preserve Rhode Island: Lippitt House Museum
Political Graveyard: Lippitt Family
National Governors Association: Henry Lippitt
 
RhodeTour: Jeanie Lippitt Weeden "Her Mother's Triumph"

1818 births
1891 deaths
Republican Party governors of Rhode Island
Lippitt family
19th-century American businesspeople
Burials at Swan Point Cemetery
19th-century American politicians